Minnesota Valley State Recreation Area is a  unit of the Minnesota state park system in the United States.  The park is not continuous but is composed of waysides, four of which are strung along the Minnesota River between Shakopee and Belle Plaine.  The various waysides are interspersed with units of the Minnesota Valley National Wildlife Refuge, a part of the Mississippi National River and Recreation Area.  Although the state recreation area is managed by the Minnesota Department of Natural Resources and the national wildlife refuge by the United States Fish and Wildlife Service, both agencies share a consistent signage to simplify visitation.

History
The lower Minnesota River valley had been recognized for its scenic and recreational potential since at least 1939, but when a bill proposing an  state park went before the Minnesota Legislature in 1967 it did not pass. Two years later a scaled-back proposal also failed. However a bill creating the Minnesota Valley State Trail did pass in 1969. Even the smallest wayside was larger than some of Minnesota's state parks. In this roundabout way, portions of the valley were added to the state park system. The Minnesota Valley National Wildlife Refuge was authorized in 1976 and additional lands originally desired for the state park received federal protection.

References
Meyer, Roy W.  Everyone's Country Estate: A History of Minnesota's State Parks.  Minnesota Historical Society Press: St. Paul, 1991.  
Minnesota Department of Natural Resources. Minnesota Valley State Recreation Area signage, brochures, and website.

External links
Minnesota Valley State Recreation Area

Mississippi National River and Recreation Area
1969 establishments in Minnesota
Minnesota River
Protected areas established in 1969
Protected areas of Carver County, Minnesota
Protected areas of Dakota County, Minnesota
Protected areas of Hennepin County, Minnesota
Protected areas of Le Sueur County, Minnesota
Protected areas of Scott County, Minnesota
State parks of Minnesota